Jostein Helge Bernhardsen (born 1945), Norwegian diplomat
Jostein Berntsen (born 1943), Norwegian politician for the Labour Party
Jostein Erstad (1922–2011), Norwegian jurist
Dag Jostein Fjærvoll (born 1947), Norwegian politician for the Christian People's Party
Jostein Flo (born 1964), Norwegian former football player
Jostein Gaarder (born 1952), Norwegian intellectual, author of several novels, short stories and children's books
Jostein Goksøyr (1922–2000), Norwegian microbiologist
Jostein Grindhaug (born 1973), Norwegian football coach and former player
Jostein Hasselgård (born 1979), the winner of Norway's national pre-selection for the Eurovision Song Contest 2003
Arne Jostein Ingebrethsen (1903–1945), Norwegian newspaper editor killed during the occupation of Norway by Nazi Germany
Jostein Løfsgaard (1923–2011), Norwegian academic executive
Jostein Nerbøvik (1938–2004), Norwegian historian
Jostein Nyhamar (1922–1993), Norwegian magazine editor, biographer and politician for the Labour Party
Jostein Pedersen (born 1959), Norwegian musical journalist and reporter, television commentator and "music intelligencia"
Jostein Rise (born 1945), Norwegian social psychologist
Kåre Jostein Simonsen (born 1948), Norwegian bandoneonist
Jostein Stige (born 1954), Norwegian sprint canoeist who competed in the mid 1970s
Jostein Wilmann (born 1953), former Norwegian professional road racing cyclist